The Arnoux system is a train articulation system, for turning on railroad tracks, invented by Jean-Claude-Républicain Arnoux and patented in France in 1838. Arnoux was the chief engineer of the Ligne de Sceaux which was originally built with very tight radii in the area around Sceaux, Hauts-de-Seine.

The line started commercial use in 1846. But the operating cost and the use of a broad gauge  of  meant it was not taken up more widely. Invention of the bogie made it redundant. It was abandoned entirely by 1893.

System

Problem 
When steam railways were in their infancy, trains comprised a steam locomotive and one or more  railway carriages with two fixed axles. As speeds increased, this design caused significant wear to the track and instability in the track ballast.

Proposed solution 
Arnoux adapted the system used on horse-carts, which pivoted each axle at its centre, to be applied equally over the two axles together.

Arnoux devised a system of chains and pulleys so that each of the wheels' correctly adjusted in yaw through the curve: as soon as the leading axle started to turn, all other axles would also turn by the same amount. Actually, this was a fatal design flaw since in a long train not all carriages are on the same part of the curve. A compromise was to use pulleys of different diameters, with guide wheels on the locomotive to control their motion.

This system was not suitable for steam locomotives so Arnoux invented a separate system for them.  The locomotives had a 2-4-2 wheel arrangement and the driving wheels were flangeless. The carrying wheels were arranged to pivot and were controlled by near-horizontal guide wheels.

Patent application 
Arnoux applied for his patent, number 8342, on 28 March 1838.

Practical application

Trials and the Grand Prix de l'Institut 
Trials took place at Saint-Mandé between 1839 and 1840 in a  circuit constructed by Alexis Dulong. These trials successfully demonstrated the stability and safety of the system. Public bodies, the Duke of Aumale and numerous members of the French Academy of Sciences, including François Arago. All unanimously praised the system.

Concession & opening of the Ligne de Sceaux 

At the suggestion of François Arago, the Arnoux system was implemented on the Ligne de Sceaux from Paris to Sceaux, Hauts-de-Seine. On 5 September 1844, Arnoux and the Minister of Public Works signed a contract to build and operate the line.

The route then had its first stop at Arcueil, then Bourg-la-Reine on a  radius curve.

Alternatives 
In fact, the problem was solved by the bogie, which was invented in the USA shortly after opening, but this was unknown in Europe at the time.

The Arnoux system bears some similarity to Cleminson's patent system. Both are designed to keep the axles radial to the curvature of the track.

Talgo utilise independent wheels mounted in a "rodal" between cars. Linkage rods keep the "rodal" aligned tangentially with the track. Like Arnoux, this system originally utilised (Iberian) broad gauge tracks, but recent versions are used on standard gauge or utilise variable gauge.

Current research may redeem the Arnoux system by replacing its mechanical steering linkages with modern electronic systems. The most promising approach places independent traction motors in each wheel which not only propel the vehicle but also steer the individual wheelset by means of torque vectoring which promises reduced weight and complexity over current bogies whilst also reducing wear on both train and track. Examples include Actiwheel and their proposed running gear for the
Next Generation Train.

Abandonment 
Use of the Arnoux System from Paris to Limours was abandoned in 1883 during negotiations with the government and the Compagnie du Chemin de Fer d'Orléans à Rouen for construction of new lines. and the Ligne de Sceaux was the only one built to its design, with its unusual track gauge and specific construction of carriages and locomotives. The track was replaced overnight with standard gauge in May 1891.

See also 
 Jean-Claude-Républicain Arnoux
 Ligne de Sceaux
 Anjubault

Sources 
 
 
 
 Revue Générale des Chemins de Fer, 1895

References

Arnoux
History of rail transport in France